Hanna-Katri Aalto (born 24 May 1978) is a Finnish former professional tennis player.

Aalto, who was raised in the town of Kajaani, competed on the professional tour in the late 1990s. Retiring in 2000, she then played a year of college tennis in the United States for the University of Mississippi.

Between 1995 and 2000, Aalto represented the Finland Fed Cup team in a total of 20 ties, winning ten singles and three doubles rubbers. Her best ranked singles opponent beaten was Britain's Julie Pullin in 2000.

ITF finals

Doubles: 8 (3–5)

References

External links
 
 
 

1978 births
Living people
Finnish female tennis players
Ole Miss Rebels women's tennis players
People from Kajaani
Sportspeople from Kainuu